The Wales national football team represents Wales in international association football and is governed by the Football Association of Wales (FAW). Between 1946 and 1959 the side played 64 matches. Although the majority of these came against the other national teams of the Home Nations in the British Home Championship, Wales also began playing teams from further afield on a regular basis for the first time. Their first competitive fixture following the end of the conflict was a 3–1 victory over Scotland in October 1946.

In 1949, Wales undertook their first European tour in which they played matches against Portugal, Belgium and Switzerland. Although Wales lost all three games, they won the reverse fixtures when all three nations travelled to Wales within the next two years. During the 1951–52 British Home Championship, Wales recorded their highest finish in the British Home Championship during the period by sharing the title with England.

The side also entered the FIFA World Cup for the first time in the 1950 tournament, but failed to qualify for either this or the following competition in which the Home Championship was used to determine the Home Nations qualifiers. The 1958 FIFA World Cup used a randomly drawn qualifying group and, although Wales finished second behind Czechoslovakia, they qualified winning a play-off match against Israel. In the tournament itself, Wales drew all three of their group matches and finished tied on points with Hungary. The two sides took part in a play-off match to determine who would advance to the quarter-final, which Wales won 2–1. Wales were defeated 1–0 by Brazil in the quarter-final. The 1958 tournament remains the only time Wales have qualified for a World Cup as of 2020.

Of the 64 matches Wales played during this period, they won 18. They recorded the most wins over Northern Ireland and their precursors Ireland, winning 5 of the 13 fixtures between the two. They also defeated Scotland three times, Israel and Portugal twice and had single victories over six other teams. They drew 14 ties and lost the remaining 32. Wales suffered the most defeats against England, losing 10 of the 14 fixtures between the two sides.

Results
Wales' score is shown first in each case. The colours listed below are also used to signify results combined with the scoreline.

Head to head records

Notes

References 
Statistics 
 
 
 

Bibliography

Footnotes

1940s in Wales
1950s in Wales
1940s